Chignon can mean:
 Chignon (hairstyle), a hairstyle with the hair in a "bun"
 Chignon (medical term), a temporary swelling left on an infant's head after delivery by a ventouse suction cap

See also 

Chingon (disambiguation)